Richard D. Young (born December 2, 1942) is a former Democratic member of the Indiana Senate who represented the 47th senate district from 1988 to 2014.

Education
Young has an AB in Behavioral Sciences from Vincennes University.

Early career
Before his tenure in the Indiana State Senate, Young was Crawford County Auditor. He was also Secretary of the Crawford County Democrat Central Committee from 1986 to 1988.

Senate

Young represented the 47th District after being appointment to succeed newly elected Lieutenant governor Frank O'Bannon in 1988. His district included parts of Crawford, Dubois, Harrison, Perry, Spencer, Warrick and Washington Counties.

He has won election to the Senate in 1990, 1994, 1998, 2002, 2006, and 2010, but lost in the general election to Republican Erin Houchin 21,000 to 15,000 votes in 2014.

He was the Democratic leader of the state senate from 1996 to 2008, but he stepped down to explore a run for Governor of Indiana. From 2008 to 2014 Young served as the Minority Leader Pro Tempore. Young is also a co-founder and member of the Rural Caucus. Young served as the Ranking Democrat on the Agriculture and Natural Resources and Local Government committees.

In 2014, he was the only Democrat in the entire General Assembly to vote for House Joint Resolution 3, the resolution for a ballot vote to ban same sex marriage in Indiana.

Committees
Corrections, Criminal and Civil Matters, Member

Local Government, Ranking Minority Member

Subcommittee on Civil Matters, Member

Utilities and Technology, Member

Race for Governor

He ran for 2008 Democratic primary for Governor of Indiana but dropped out early on in the primary and chose not to endorse a candidate in the primary between architect Jim Schellinger, and winner, former Congresswoman Jill Long Thompson.

Personal
He and his first wife, the late Elaine Young, had five children. He is currently married to Ashira.

References

External links
State Senator Richard D. Young official Indiana State Legislature site

 

|-

Democratic Party Indiana state senators
1942 births
Living people
People from Harrison County, Indiana
Vincennes University alumni
People from Crawford County, Indiana